Gilbert Price (September 10, 1942 – January 2, 1991) was an American operatic baritone and actor.

Price was a protégé of Langston Hughes. He was a life member of New York's famed Actors Studio. Price first gained notice in 1964, for his performances in Hughes' Off-Broadway production of Jerico-Jim Crow. For his work, Price received a Theatre World Award.

Early life
Price was born on September 10, 1942, in New York City of African-American heritage. In 1960, he graduated from Erasmus Hall High School, where he stood out for both his talent and gentle, easygoing manner. It has been written that while he was a protégé of Langston Hughes, Hughes had become smitten with the young Price. Unpublished love poems by Hughes were addressed to a man Hughes called Beauty; it has been posited these poems referred to Price.

Career
Price made guest appearances on several television talk and variety shows including The Ed Sullivan Show, Red Skelton, Garry Moore and The Merv Griffin Show. Price also sang oratorios, including Leonard Bernstein's Mass, in 1971.

Awards
Price was nominated for three Tony Awards and was the recipient of a Theatre World Award:
 Jerico-Jim Crow (1964) – Theatre World Award
 Lost in the Stars (1972) – Tony Award for Best Featured Actor in a Musical
 The Night That Made America Famous (1975) – Tony Award for Best Featured Actor in a Musical
 Timbuktu! (1978) – Tony Award for Best Actor in a Musical

Other works
 Fly Blackbird (1962) - C. Bernard Jackson & James Hatch
 The Roar of the Greasepaint – The Smell of the Crowd (1965) - Leslie Bricusse & Anthony Newley
 Promenade (1969) - Maria Irene Fornes & Al Carmines
 1600 Pennsylvania Avenue (1976) - Leonard Bernstein & Alan Jay Lerner

Death
Price died in Vienna, Austria, in 1991 of accidental asphyxiation due to a faulty space heater. He was 48 years old.

References

External links

Gilbert Price Obituary The New York Times
Find A Grave: 

1942 births
1991 deaths
American male musical theatre actors
American baritones
American male film actors
American male television actors
Male actors from New York City
African-American male actors
Deaths from asphyxiation
Erasmus Hall High School alumni
20th-century American male actors
20th-century American singers
20th-century American male singers
20th-century African-American male singers